Timothy Donoghue (March 17, 1825 to March 19, 1908) was an Irish soldier who fought in the American Civil War. Donoghue received the United States' highest award for bravery during combat, the Medal of Honor, for his action during the Battle of Fredericksburg in Virginia on 13 December 1862. He was honored with the award on 17 January 1894.

Biography
Donoghue was born in Ireland on 17 March 1825. He joined the 69th New York Infantry from New York City in September 1862. He was promoted to Sergeant in January 1863, and transferred to the Veteran Reserve Corps in December.  He died on 19 March 1908 and his remains are interred at the Holy Cross Cemetery in Brooklyn, New York.

Medal of Honor citation

See also

List of American Civil War Medal of Honor recipients: A–F

References

1825 births
1908 deaths
Irish-born Medal of Honor recipients
People of New York (state) in the American Civil War
Union Army officers
United States Army Medal of Honor recipients
American Civil War recipients of the Medal of Honor